Bill Edwards is an American businessman. He owns numerous properties in St. Petersburg, Florida.

Biography 
Edwards grew up in New Bedford, Massachusetts. He served in the United States Marine Corps during the Vietnam War, earning a Purple Heart. After the war, he moved to Detroit and entered the mortgage business. Born Edward Francis Sylvia III, he changed his name to William Larry Edwards when he moved to Detroit.

Edwards served as president of Mortgage Investors Corp., which the Tampa Bay Times described as the "nation's largest VA mortgage lender" in 2005. In 2013, the Edwards-owned Mortgage Investors was fined $7.5 million for violating the federal do not call list. That same year, Edwards negotiated a sale of Mortgage Investors to HomeBancorp, but the deal was never completed. After the failure of the deal, Mortgage Investors stopped making new home loans and laid off the majority of its staff. In 2015, two mortgage brokers that never did any business with MIC sued Edwards, alleging that Mortgage Investors had defrauded veteran home buyers and the United States Department of Veterans Affairs.

Property ownership
In 2009, Edwards bought the Treasure Island Tennis & Yacht Club. In 2011, he won the right to manage the Mahaffey Theater. Edwards also owns Big3 Entertainment, which has produced records for artists such as Cheap Trick.

In 2011, he bought the BayWalk in downtown St. Petersburg. In 2014, the BayWalk reopened as Sundial St. Pete.

In 2014, Edwards bought a block of St. Petersburg known as the Tropicana Block.

Sports ownership
In 2013, Edwards bought a controlling interest in the second-tier Tampa Bay Rowdies soccer club, then playing in the North American Soccer League. The team has played in the United Soccer League since 2017. Edwards hoped to move the Rowdies up to Major League Soccer, the league above the USL. He operated Al Lang Stadium for the city of St. Petersburg, and owns the nearby McNulty Station parking garage and a Rowdies-themed bar and restaurant. In October 2018, it was announced that Edwards had sold the club to Tampa Bay Rays, the area's Major League Baseball franchise, who announced plans to purchase the Rowdies and assume control of Al Lang Stadium.

In November 2016, Edwards filed a complaint against the Rowdies' arch-rival, Fort Lauderdale Strikers' holding company, Miami FC, LLC, over money loaned to the struggling club. Edwards claimed that the team had failed to pay him back $300,000 in loans. He sought damages and foreclosure on Fort Lauderdale's assets in the lawsuit. A signed promissory note showed that the collateral put up to secure the loans included the team's patents, copyrights, trademarks, rights to use of the name "Fort Lauderdale Strikers" along with other tangible assets.

In May 2017 Edwards was awarded a summary judgment in the case, and after a June 2017 public sale, gained control of the copyrights, trademarks and any rights to the use of the name "Fort Lauderdale Strikers" or any variation for $5,100. He has yet to announce what he plans to do with the Strikers brand.

Political activities 
Edwards donated $1 million to the campaign of Florida Governor Rick Scott and $4.6 million to the 2012 Republican National Convention. He donated $350,000 to the presidential candidacy of Jeb Bush.

References

Living people
Year of birth missing (living people)
People from New Bedford, Massachusetts
United States Marine Corps personnel of the Vietnam War
United States Marines
American real estate businesspeople
North American Soccer League executives
Tampa Bay Rowdies
Tampa Bay Rowdies executives
USL Championship executives